The 1998 NCAA Division I Men's Swimming and Diving Championships were contested in March 1998 at the James E. Martin Aquatics Center at Auburn University in Auburn, Alabama at the 75th annual NCAA-sanctioned swim meet to determine the team and individual national champions of Division I men's collegiate swimming and diving in the United States.

Stanford topped the team standings for the eighth time, finishing 104.5 points ahead of hosts and defending champions Auburn.

Team standings
Note: Top 10 only
(H) = Hosts
(DC) = Defending champions
Full results

See also
List of college swimming and diving teams

References

NCAA Division I Men's Swimming and Diving Championships
NCAA Division I Swimming And Diving Championships
NCAA Division I Men's Swimming And Diving Championships
NCAA Division I Men's Swimming and Diving Championships